Sacada approximans is a species of snout moth first described by John Henry Leech in 1889. It is found in Korea, Japan, China, Myanmar and India.

The wingspan is 25–35 mm. The ground colour of the adults is dark reddish brown or grayish brown. Adults are on wing from May to August.

The larvae feed on Quercus acutissima, Quercus acuta and Castanea crenata.

References

Moths described in 1889
Pyralinae
Moths of Japan